Extreme Honey: The Very Best of Warner Brothers Years is a 1997 compilation album by Elvis Costello, spanning the years 1989–1997.

The collection contains one exclusive track, "The Bridge I Burned". Costello had originally recorded a cover of Prince's "Pop Life" for inclusion, but Prince denied him permission to release it.

Track listing
All tracks written by Elvis Costello except where noted.

 "The Bridge I Burned" – 5:19
 "Veronica" (Paul McCartney, Costello) – 3:09
 "Sulky Girl" – 5:07
 "So Like Candy" (McCartney, Costello) – 4:36
 "13 Steps Lead Down" – 3:18
 "All This Useless Beauty" – 4:37
 "My Dark Life" – 6:19
 "The Other Side of Summer" – 3:55
 "Kinder Murder" – 3:26
 "Deep Dark Truthful Mirror" – 4:06
 "Hurry Down Doomsday (The Bugs Are Taking Over)" (Costello, Jim Keltner) – 4:04
 "Poor Fractured Atlas" – 4:01
 "The Birds Will Still Be Singing" – 4:23
 "London's Brilliant Parade" – 4:22
 "Tramp the Dirt Down" – 5:40
 "Couldn't Call It Unexpected No. 4" – 3:50
 "I Want to Vanish" – 3:15
 "All the Rage" – 3:52

References

1997 greatest hits albums
Elvis Costello compilation albums
Warner Records compilation albums